The 2020 IIHF World Championship Division II was an international ice hockey tournament run by the International Ice Hockey Federation.

The Group A tournament would have been held in Zagreb, Croatia and the Group B tournament in Reykjavík, Iceland from 19 to 25 April 2020.

Both tournaments were cancelled on 13 March 2020 due to the COVID-19 pandemic.

Group A tournament

Participants

Match officials
Four referees and seven linesmen are selected for the tournament.

Standings

Results
All times are local (UTC+2).

Group B tournament

Participants

Match officials
Four referees and seven linesmen are selected for the tournament.

Standings

Results
All times are local (UTC+2).

References

External links
Group A website
Group B website

2020
Division II
2020 IIHF World Championship Division II
2020 IIHF World Championship Division II
Sports competitions in Zagreb
Sports competitions in Reykjavík
2020 in Croatian sport
2020 in Icelandic sport
April 2020 sports events in Europe
Ice hockey events cancelled due to the COVID-19 pandemic